Erra Fazira (born Fazira Wan Chek, 9 February 1974), is a Malaysian actress, singer, fashion model, TV host, film producer, as well as beauty pageant titleholder who was crowned Miss Malaysia World 1992.

She rose to fame in the early and mid 1990s following her roles in Sembilu, Sembilu 2, Maria Mariana and Pasrah. She received critical acclaim and a Best Actress in a Leading Role trophy at Malaysia Film Festival twice for her portrayal of inspiring young sales girl and part time student Nurul Ain in Soal Hati (2001) and as Nora, an old lady with dark past in the film Hingga Hujung Nyawa (2005). She received another three Malaysia Film Festival's Best Actress award nomination for her performance in Soalnya Siapa? (2003), Persona Non Grata (2006), and Anak (2008).

Early life
Fazira was born in Sungai Choh, a small town in Rawang, Selangor the first child and the only daughter of Wan Chek and Azizah Zaik. Her parents were ethnic Malays. Fazira was an active student during her school days and developed a passion for acting, which she showed an interest in at a very early age. She also joined many school's clubs and societies such as Scouting, St John Ambulance of Malaysia, the English Language Society and the Culture Club. She was also an active sports student back then and has represented herself and her school in Netball. She said that the learning and involvement she did in those clubs played an important role in her later career.

Fazira attended several different schools including SM Puteri Titiwangsa, Kuala Lumpur.

Career

Beauty pageant (1992) 
At the age of 18, Fazira went to take part in the 1992 Malaysian beauty pageant after being persuaded by her aunt. She competed against thirteen others and eventually won the title of Miss Malaysia World 1992. As Miss Malaysia, Fazira went on to compete in the Miss World 1992 pageant, representing Malaysia which was held in Sun City, South Africa. She secured the 15th place during the preliminary competition.

Music career (1993–2007)
In 1994, after the release of her first feature film "Sembilu", Fazira released her eponymous self-titled EP under Polygram Records. She later records two albums with the label before leaving Polygram to join Sony Music. Her first studio album is Aku dan Dia (1995) with its hits single "Yang Terindah Hanyalah Sementara", and followed by 2.5 Sayang in 1996 with "Pertemuan" released as single.

Three years later, in 1999, Fazira's fourth album and the first with Sony Music, Kini was released. Her 2001 single, "Sandarkan" along with Siti Nurhaliza’s song, "Lakaran Kehidupan" (from Siti's seventh album, Safa) was chosen by TV3 as part of the network's 3D campaign. Music videos for both songs were filmed in 3D where TV3 viewers wearing 3D glasses while watching it.

In 2002, her fifth album, Sampai Bertemu was released, followed by sixth album, Kini Kembali (2004). She is one of few Malaysian artists who contributed a special song titled "Suluhkan Sinar" ("Shine the Light"). Produced by KRU and released in January 2005, the song was specially dedicated to the victims of the 2004 Indian Ocean earthquake and tsunami. In 2006, Fazira released her seventh and last studio album, Ya Atau Tidak.

Acting career (1994–present)
Fazira was approached by director, Yusof Haslam, to star as the lead role in Sembilu. The film opened in cinema on 18 August 1994. The film also marked the first time Erra worked together with her then former dating partner, Awie. Other films roles followed including a sequel of Sembilu the following year, where Fazira reprised her role as Rosmawati Sofian.

From 1996 until 2000, Fazira starred in four of Yusof's directed films including the portraying of Maria Zakaria in both Maria Mariana and its sequel Maria Mariana II. In the 2000 film Soal Hati, Fazira starred played the character of Nurul Ain.  Fazira won the Malaysia Film Festival Award for Best Actress for her role in the film.

Starting 2001, Fazira began to work with many different directors for her films including Ahmad Idham for Mr. Cinderella (2002) and Abdul Razak Mohaideen for Cinta Kolestrol (2003) among others. In 2004, Fazira went on to star opposite her then former husband, Yusry bin Abdul Halim, in the 2004 film Hingga Hujung Nyawa, also directed by Abdul Razak. Through this film, Fazira once again was awarded the Malaysia Film Festival Award for Best Actress as for the portrayal of Nora Halim in the movie.

In 2002, Fazira acted in a telemovie and hosted the show, Fesyen Tempo. Since 2018, she became part of the cast member of longest-running Malaysian action drama series, Gerak Khas, playing the role of ASP Jeslina.

Personal life
Erra Fazira married Malaysian singer and actor Yusry Abd Halim from KRU, on 15 June 2003, Yusry's 30th birthday. They officially divorced on 16 June 2006.

She later married former Suria FM Chief Operating Officer, Engku Emran Engku Zainal Abidin from 2007 to 2014, they have a daughter named Engku Aleesya 2(9)/1(2). They later divorced on 18 January 2014.

Discography

Studio albums
 Erra Fazira (1994)
 Aku dan Dia (1995)
 Menyanyi Bersama (1996)
 2.5 Sayang (1997)
 Kini (1999)
 Sampai Bertemu (2002)
 Kini Kembali (2003)
 Ya atau Tidak (2006)

Compilation albums
 Koleksi Klasik (1998)
 Best of Erra Fazira (2001)
 Koleksi Istimewa Buatmu (2001)
 Keunggulan Erra Fazira (2007)

Filmography

Film

Telemovie

Television series

Television

References

External links

 

Living people
1974 births
People from Selangor
Malaysian people of Malay descent
Malaysian Muslims
Malaysian actresses
Malaysian female models
Malaysian women pop singers
Malaysian television personalities
Miss World 1992 delegates
Malaysian beauty pageant winners
Malay-language singers
Metrowealth Pictures contract players
Malaysian rhythm and blues singers
21st-century Malaysian women singers